

366001–366100 

|-bgcolor=#f2f2f2
| colspan=4 align=center | 
|}

366101–366200 

|-bgcolor=#f2f2f2
| colspan=4 align=center | 
|}

366201–366300 

|-id=252
| 366252 Evanmillsap ||  || Evan D. Millsap (1992–2019) was a passionate geologist and aspiring paleontologist. He was a well traveled citizen of the world and accomplished mountaineer. Evan had a love of family, culture, science, and deep time. || 
|-id=272
| 366272 Medellín ||  || Medellin, the second largest city in Colombia and is a financial, commercial and industrial center. || 
|}

366301–366400 

|-bgcolor=#f2f2f2
| colspan=4 align=center | 
|}

366401–366500 

|-bgcolor=#f2f2f2
| colspan=4 align=center | 
|}

366501–366600 

|-bgcolor=#f2f2f2
| colspan=4 align=center | 
|}

366601–366700 

|-id=689
| 366689 Rohrbaugh ||  || Catherine Rohrbaugh is a 7th grade science teacher at Dillard Drive Middle School in Raleigh, North Carolina. || 
|}

366701–366800 

|-bgcolor=#f2f2f2
| colspan=4 align=center | 
|}

366801–366900 

|-id=852
| 366852 Ti ||  || Teresa ("Ti") Lacruz Martin (born 1954) is the eldest sister of the Spanish discoverer Juan Lacruz. She is a law graduate of the Universidad Complutense de Madrid, and she works as Senior Director of Environment, Health and Safety & Ethics at General Dynamics European Land Systems. || 
|}

366901–367000 

|-bgcolor=#f2f2f2
| colspan=4 align=center | 
|}

References 

366001-367000